In Wales, a Legislative Competence Order (LCO; pronounced 'elco') was a piece of constitutional legislation in the form of an Order in Council. It transferred legislative authority from the Parliament of the United Kingdom to the National Assembly for Wales. The LCO had to be approved by the Assembly, the Secretary of State for Wales, both Houses of Parliament, and then the Queen in Council.

Each LCO added a 'Matter' to one of the 'Fields' stated in Schedule 5 of the Government of Wales Act 2006. This is the list of areas in which the National Assembly for Wales may legislate. The only other way that Schedule 5 can be amended is by the inclusion of provisions in UK Parliamentary Bills (referred to as 'Framework Powers' by the UK Government and 'Measure-making powers' by the National Assembly).

Each Matter then gave the National Assembly for Wales permission to pass legislation known as an Assembly Measure, which operates in Wales just as an Act of Parliament operates across the UK (i.e. can be enforced by the Courts). An Assembly Measure allows provisions to be made in a certain area, e.g., Health and Social Services, Education, for the Assembly to pass.

The text that came with the LCO contains the actual title of the legislation (Measure) that would be passed by the Welsh Assembly later on, for example "Provision about the curriculum in schools maintained by local education authorities" would appear on the LCO and would later form the title of the Measure once written up.

Following a referendum held in March 2011, the assembly gained the ability to pass bills for Acts of the Assembly in all twenty devolved areas without the need for the consent of the UK parliament. The assembly also lost the ability to pass Assembly Measures resulting in the LCO process becoming redundant. In total, fifteen LCOs were made between 2007 and 2011.

See also
Measure of the National Assembly for Wales - the laws passed by the National Assembly for Wales once the LCO is passed. 
Act of Parliament
Statutory Instruments
Welsh law

References

External links 
OPSI list of LCOs approved
Current list of LCOs
Consolidated List of Matters Conferred on the Assembly

Government of Wales
Welsh laws
Constitutional laws of Wales
Orders in Council
United Kingdom administrative law